Phil John (born 5 February 1962) is a former Welsh rugby union player. A hooker, he played his club rugby for Pontypridd RFC and representative rugby for the Barbarians.

References

Welsh rugby union players
Rugby union hookers
Pontypridd RFC players
Barbarian F.C. players
Living people
1962 births
Place of birth missing (living people)
20th-century Welsh people